Yeşim Salkım (born 12 April 1968) is a Turkish singer and actress. Her paternal family is of Albanian descent.

Discography
Albums
 Hiç Keyfim Yok (1994)
 Ferman (1995)
 Yoktan Geliyorum (1997)
 Hep Böyle Kal (2000)
 Vefa Borcu (2001)
 Ayna (2005)
 Bazen (2006)
 Casablanca (2007) (musical album)
 Sen Nasılsan Öyleyim (2008)
 7 (2009)
 İstanbul'da Aşk (2010)
 Bizim Şarkımız (2012) (musical album)

Singles
 "Sevgilim" (1998)
 "Yuvarlanan Taşlar" (2007)
 "Bambaşka" (2009)
 "Piyango" (2011)
 "Duymayan Kalmasın" (2014)
 "Şehrin Işıkları" (2015)
 "Unutursun Gönlüm" (2015)
 "Erkeğin Zillisi" (feat. Serdar Ayyıldız) (2016)
 "Rüyalar" (feat. Ercüment Vural) (2018)
 "Aramadın Aylardır" (Çılgınlar Kulübü) (2019)
 "Katil Uşak" (2020)
 "Niye Hayat?" (with Bade Derinöz) (2021)
 "Küstüm Ne Demek" (2022)

Filmography

TV programs
 Yılbaşı Özel – ATV 1994
 Bir Dilek Tut – season 2; Fox /season 3; Star TV 2007
 Kadınlar ve Erkekler – season 1; 2007 ATV
 Yaş 15 – season 1; Fox 2009
 Hayata Şans Ver – CINE5; 2012–2013
 Yeşim Salkım ile Şeffaf Masa – TGRT Haber; 2021–

Theater
 Atları da Vururlar – 1998
 Casablanca – 2007
 Bizim Şarkımız – 2012

References

External links
 

1968 births
Living people
Turkish film actresses
Turkish television actresses
Turkish women singers
Turkish people of Albanian descent
Best Actress Golden Orange Award winners